Mae Wang is a district (amphoe) in the central part of Chiang Mai province in northern Thailand. The largest settlement and administrative seat of Mae Wang is Ban Kad, a satellite town of Chiang Mai. Across Mae Wang district, the ethnic Hill Tribe people are more present than in other parts of Thailand. Groups with large populations in the district include the Karen people, Hmong and Akha peoples. In the lowlands near Ban Kad Thai people are more common, and as elevations increase on the Western slopes of Doi Inthanon, ethnic minorities become more common. Past Mae Sa Pok, on Rural Road 1013, The villages are almost exclusively Karen, with Hmong people living in higher elevations.

Geography
Mae Wang district occupies the western slopes of Thanon Thong Chai Range (Pronounced "Tanon Tong Chai"), and elevations in the district increase towards Thailand's tallest mountain. The dominant feature of the district, and its namesake, the Mae Wang River, rises in the peaks and flows east towards Chiang Mai before eventually joining the Ping River on the border of Chiang Mai and Lamphun province.

The majority of the District's 30,000 people live in the valley of this river, and many weirs have been built along its course to irrigate rice fields. Near its source, a Hmong village renowned for its Sakura blossoms, Khun Wang, is home to Thailand's highest school.

Neighboring districts are (from the south clockwise) Doi Lo, Chom Thong, Mae Chaem, Samoeng, Hang Dong and San Pa Tong of Chiang Mai Province.

Flora

Sapria Himalayana is a rare holo-parasitic flower related to Rafflesia. This particular specimen was found in Mae Wang District.

History
The minor district (king amphoe) was established on 1 April 1990, when the four tambons Ban Kat, Thung Pi, Thung Ruang Thong, and Mae Win were split off from San Pa Tong district. On 7 September 1995 it was upgraded to a full district.

Administration
The district is divided into five sub-districts (tambon), which are further subdivided into 62 villages (muban). Ban Kat is a township (thesaban tambon) which covers parts of tambons Ban Kat and Don Pao. There are a further five tambon administrative organizations (TAO).

Gallery

References

External links
amphoe.com (archived)

Mae Wang